Final Score is a BBC Television football news and results programme produced by BBC Sport. The programme is broadcast on late Saturday afternoons in England, Wales and Northern Ireland, usually on BBC One. BBC Northern Ireland opts away during the last ten minutes to cover local results in Final Score from Northern Ireland, normally just after the Premier League scores are read out. BBC Scotland runs a different programme altogether – Sportscene Results. Final Score is also broadcast on Boxing Day and New Year's Day and sometimes on either Good Friday or Easter Monday. A special Sunday edition is broadcast on the final day of the Premier League season.

Final Score is also broadcast on Saturday afternoons on the BBC Red Button and online for two hours before the BBC One broadcast begins. An additional half-hour was also broadcast live on BBC World News, the BBC's internationally broadcast news channel, but this was discontinued from the 2015–16 season.

Format
The programme provides viewers with the results from the main football matches played on that day. The presenters are joined by two studio pundits discussing the day's play whilst watching the Premier League games in the studio and this is supplemented by reporters at all of the Premier League matches. There are also reporters at every EFL Championship match and at the top games in EFL League One and EFL League Two, and at least one Scottish Professional Football League game. Mark Clemmit or Kelly Somers provides regular round-ups of the top stories from the rest of the EFL matches. The programme also includes interviews with managers and players.

At 5pm, when all of the results are in, the day's scores are read by Mike West. The round-up covers games from the Premier League to the Conference National in England, in Scotland the four divisions of the Scottish Professional Football League as well as the Welsh Premier League in Wales and the Irish League in Northern Ireland. Next is a review of the league tables for most divisions and this is followed by post-game interviews with managers, conducted by the commentators for Match of the Day. After the main BBC television broadcast has finished the programme continues until 5.30pm on the Red Button.

History

Early days
Final Score had been part of the BBC's long-running programme Grandstand as far back as 1958. The football results appeared on a device dubbed 'the Teleprinter' and the presenter stood next to the Teleprinter with a camera pointed at the actual printer. By the 1980s, a live shot of the printer had been replaced by an on-screen computerised version and was renamed the vidiprinter.

The results would come from the Press Association (PA), who appointed a correspondent to attend each match and report back the half-time and full-time scores to its offices in London. The PA would then use the technology of the day to provide a feed to BBC Television Centre.  The Press Association provided the vidiprinter results service until Opta Sports took over the contract for the 2013–14 season onwards. The host of the main Grandstand programme used to provide commentary on the scores as they came in to try to reflect how each result affected the league, which meant meticulous preparation was necessary.

After the majority of the results came in, the scores would then be collated and announced as the 'Classified Football Results' in alphabetical order starting with the highest leagues first. Remarkably, only three people have regularly read the football results on the programme: Len Martin (from 1958 until 1995), Tim Gudgin (from 1995 until 2011) and Mike West since 2011. Gudgin read the results for the last time on 19 November 2011, then retired at the age of 81. He cited the BBC's decision to move the programme from London to Manchester as one of the reasons for his departure and the difficulty of travelling from his home in Hampshire, particularly in winter. The classified results were followed by the pools news and score draws and then by the league tables, although the pools news element was dropped due to its decline.

Whilst football was always the mainstay of Final Score, news and results from other sports, such as rugby union, and until 1987, racing results were also included.

A brief version, usually lasting for 5 to 10 minutes, was aired during the summer when football was out of season and these summer editions included a cricket scoreboard.

Stand-alone editions of Final Score were broadcast on Boxing Day, New Year's Day and Easter Monday when there was a full programme of football fixtures and when Grandstand was not being shown. These editions were generally 15 minutes long and did not include the vidiprinter sequence as they usually began at 4.50pm.

Changes
Technology has gradually improved and by the 1980s a live shot of the actual Teleprinter had been replaced by a computer screen version, at which point the Teleprinter became referred to as 'the Vidiprinter'. However, the modern-day vidiprinter used by the programme still emulates the original typing system. There are now Goalflashes throughout the afternoon for every match played in the English and Scottish leagues, the Conference, Welsh Premier League and Northern Ireland.

Modernisations
During its last few years there was no longer a main presenter for Grandstand, so from the start of the 2001–02 season Final Score was broadcast as an individual programme with Ray Stubbs as the regular presenter and Mark Lawrenson providing comment on the results as they came in. At this point, Final Score became a football-only programme. The half time round-up remained part of Grandstand until the start of the 2004–05 season when an afternoon-long version of the programme was launched. Initially called Score Interactive, the programme is broadcast from 14:30 on the BBC's interactive service, the BBC Red Button, and provides a rolling mix of scores, reports and punditry. By this time, the transmission time on BBC One had been extended and was now starting at 4.30pm rather than when the full-time whistles were beginning to sound.

In November 2007 a midweek version of the programme was introduced. Rather than being a programme in its own right, it is a simulcast of BBC Radio 5 Live with graphics and vidiprinter. Audio options were occasionally made available for BBC Local Radio commentaries of games involving Championship sides, but this was removed when the BBC decided to make the Red Button service a 'single feed' to all broadcast platforms in October 2012. The midweek version is shown when there were primarily Premier League or important UEFA Champions League matches taking place. It is a Red Button and Online exclusive, so therefore does not appear on BBC1 or BBC2.

When the BBC regained the rights for the FA Cup in 2014–15, the programme would be renamed FA Cup Final Score when the competition is the main focus, including a modified logo featuring the FA Cup trophy and Sunday broadcasts which show the key incidents from the day's games.  Although centering on the FA Cup, there are also updates from matches in other domestic competitions that are taking place.

Beginning with the 2017/18 season, the show's graphics were updated, to tie in with the rebrand of BBC Sport at the time.

Studio
In the autumn of 2011, Final Score moved from studio TC5 at TV Centre in London, which had been its home for many years. Its new home is located in Salford Quays at Dock10, MediaCityUK. The last programme from TC5 was broadcast on 19 November 2011.

Ahead of the 2019–20 Premier League season, BBC Sport upgraded the studio that Match of the Day, Match of the Day 2, Football Focus, and Final Score broadcasts from.

The facility uses a "4K UHD ready virtual reality studio." It uses Epic Games' Unreal Engine 4 rendering technology.

The studio is located at the Dock10 facility at MediaCityUK in Salford.

Presenter and pundits
The current main presenter of Final Score is Jason Mohammad, who replaced Gabby Logan at the start of the 2013–14 season. Stand-in presenters include Eilidh Barbour, Kelly Somers and Will Perry.  The programme was previously presented by Ray Stubbs until he left the BBC at the end of the 2008–09 season.

Two (or occasionally three) pundits appear per episode. Pundits who appear on the programme most commonly as of the 2021/22 season are Garth Crooks, Martin Keown, Dion Dublin, Leon Osman, Ashley Williams, Jermaine Beckford, Fara Williams, and Stephen Warnock. Many other pundits have appeared during the history of the programme, including: Robbie Savage, Jason Roberts, Mark Bright, Steve Claridge, Peter Schmeichel, Danny Mills, Kevin Kilbane, Alex Scott, and Trevor Sinclair. Sinclair was fired by the BBC in January 2018 after admitting drink driving and racial abuse charges.

Reporters appearing most weeks include Will Perry, Chris Wise, Vicki Sparks, Robyn Cowen, Eilidh Barbour, John Acres, Ivan Gaskell, Naz Premji, Emma Saunders, Aaron Paul, Hamish Marshall, Marc Webber, Sohail Sahi, Nikesh Rughani, Shourjo Sarkar, Andy Stevenson, Betty Glover, Katie Shanahan, Mike Williams, Connie McLaughlin and Roddy Forsyth.

Theme tune
The current theme tune is "Bones" by Galantis and has been since the start of the 2019–20 football season. Previous themes have included "Pumpin Blood" by NONONO used between the 2013–14 and 2018–19 football seasons, "The King and All of His Men" by Wolf Gang used between the 2011–12 and 2012–13 football seasons, "Jump in the Pool" by Friendly Fires used between the 2009–10 and 2010–11 football seasons and "Theme From Sparta FC" by The Fall between the 2005–06 and 2008–09 football seasons and 50 Cent - In da Club between the 2003–04 football season.

References

External links

 

BBC Television shows
BBC Sport
English football on television
Premier League on television
1958 British television series debuts
1950s British sports television series
1960s British sports television series
1970s British sports television series
1980s British sports television series
1990s British sports television series
2000s British sports television series
2010s British sports television series
2020s British sports television series
English-language television shows